CFNO-FM is a Canadian radio station that broadcasts at 93.1 FM in Marathon, Ontario. The station broadcasts an adult contemporary format with the brand name Your Hometown Sound.

The station was launched in 1982 by North Superior Broadcasting. It was acquired by Dougall Media in 2002.

Rebroadcasters
CFNO serves a large portion of Northwestern Ontario through a network of rebroadcast transmitters.

In 1986, CFNO received approval to add a transmitter at Nipigon/Red Rock at 103.7 MHz. However, the station was advised to seek another frequency for the rebroadcaster instead. CFNO-FM eventually established a transmitter in Nipigon at 100.7 MHz.

In 1988, CFNO received approval to add a transmitter, CFNO-FM-6, at Dubreuilville at 93.9 MHz. In 2004, the station was authorized to delete CFNO-FM-6 as that transmitter was no longer required, for reasons unknown.

On October 25, 2013, Dougall Media submitted an application to operate a new FM transmitter in Beardmore at 107.1 MHz. The transmitter was approved on February 12, 2014.

On October 6, 2015, the CRTC approved changes to the authorized contours of CFNO-FM-2, by increasing the effective radiated power from 4 to 280 watts and the effective height of antenna above average terrain from 17.5 to 37 metres. As a result of the increase in power, the transmitter's status will change from that of a low-power, unprotected service to that of a protected Class A1 service.

On November 10, 2021, North Superior Broadcasting Ltd. received CRTC approval to change the authorized contours of CFNO-FM-5 Longlac, Ontario by changing the class from unprotected low-power (LP) to regular power A1, increasing the effective radiated power from 4 to 125 watts, decreasing the effective height of the antenna above average terrain from 30.0 to 2.1 meters. On the same day, North Superior Broadcasting received CRTC approval to change the authorized contours of CFNO-FM-7 Nakina, Ontario, from an unprotected LP to a regular power A1, by increasing the effective radiated power from 49 to 110 watts, and increasing the effective height of the antenna above average terrain from 4.0 to 13.8 meters.

CJWA
CJWA-FM in Wawa was also formerly a rebroadcaster of CFNO. North Superior launched a separate station there in 1998, after the town's sole local radio station (also going by the CJWA callsign, but at 1240 AM) was closed in 1996. CFNO's former rebroadcaster in Chapleau also became a rebroadcaster of CJWA's signal instead.

North Superior sold CJWA at the same time as CFNO, although to a different new owner, Labbe Media.

References

External links
CFNO-FM - official website 

Fno
Fno
Radio stations established in 1982
1982 establishments in Ontario